Purton is a hamlet on the west bank of the River Severn, in the civil parish of Lydney in Gloucestershire, England.  It lies opposite the village of Purton near Berkeley on the east bank of the river.

The name of the place derives from the Old English pirige tun, meaning "pear orchard". It was mentioned in the Domesday Book.

Purton was a small port, and there was a ferry across the river, Purton Passage, to the other Purton by 1282. In the late 18th and early 19th century, there was also a ford across the river here. In 1740, the removal of a large rock from the river bed on the Berkeley side caused the river to shift its channel. This meant only a single crossing a day was possible and led to a decline in the trade. The river had returned to its old channel ten years later, although it was altered by another shift in 1761. In the late 18th century and the early 19th the river was often forded at Purton, but some people, misjudging the tide times, were drowned.  The ferry continued in use until 1879, when it was replaced by the Severn Railway Bridge.

The manor house is a Grade II* listed building. It dates from 1618 and lies immediately above the Chepstow/Gloucester railway line which passes in a deep cutting at that point. It has a principal block, of three storeys and three bays, parallel with the river and a wing which projects to the north-east, with a small extension added in the 19th century. Historic England, in its listing record, describes the manor house as "an important survival, somewhat modified over the centuries".
A barn to the west of the manor house is listed at Grade II. Old Severn Bridge House, which Verey and Brooks note was formerly a hotel, is also Grade II listed.

To the north of the hamlet, the Purton Viaduct crosses the road from Etloe. Designed in 1830, and contemporary with the Stockton and Darlington Railway, it was planned as part of a crossing of the Severn, the Purton Steam Carriage Road which was never completed. Historic England consider the viaduct of "considerable historical and industrial archaeological interest".

Footnotes

References

Sources
 
 
 

Hamlets in Gloucestershire
Lydney
Forest of Dean